Zanchetta is a surname. Notable people with the surname include:

Andrea Zanchetta (born 1975), Italian football midfielder
Alberto Ángel Zanchetta
Gustavo Óscar Zanchetta (born 1964), Argentine Catholic bishop
Jordan Zanchetta (born 1995), Australian rules footballer